Smith Memorial Student Union is a student union building on the Portland State University campus in Portland, Oregon, in the United States. It is named after PSU student land later graduate teaching assistant Michael Smith (1944-1968).

References

External links

 
 Profile: Visit the Smith Memorial Student Union, Portland State University
 Smith Memorial Student Union, Portland State University

Buildings and structures in Portland, Oregon
Portland State University buildings